Fire (Beatriz da Costa) is a superheroine appearing in American comic books published by DC Comics.

Michelle Hurd played Fire in the 1997 pilot film Justice League of America. Natalie Morales went by the name "Green Fury" in an episode of the 2017 series Powerless.

Publication history
A version of her first appeared in Super Friends #25 (October 1979) and was created by E. Nelson Bridwell and Ramona Fradon.

Fictional character biography

Pre-Crisis

Super Friends

Beatriz da Costa, alias Green Fury, is bequeathed her powers due to Brazilian mysticism and is the president of the Brazilian branch of Wayne Enterprises. She possesses an array of abilities which includes the power to exhale vast quantities of mystical green fire. She can also fly, alter her clothing at will, and display a limited capacity to project hallucinations. In her first appearance, she confronts and battles Superman, who is controlled by the "puppet master" Overlord, Sandor Fine. In her next appearance, Green Fury calls The Super Friends to help defeat the villain Green Thumb (Fargo Keyes), and months later reveals her secret origin to them to thwart the demons from a green hell.

Global Guardians
Green Fury becomes a member of the Global Guardians when Superman, recruited by Doctor Mist, asks for assistance in locating one of many ancient artifacts being pursued by a powerful group of evil mystics. They battle a wizard called 'El Dorado' in an ancient, overgrown city deep in the jungle. The two face off against 'spirit jaguars' and seemingly lose the artifact, a crown, to the wizard. Costa then assists Superman and other Guardians in battling the wizards, El Dorado included, on Easter Island. The heroes catch a break when it's learned Superman had faked the artifacts with super-speed. This prevents the rise to power of the entity the wizards followed, Thaumar Dhai. Though not as powerful as planned, Dhai was still a threat. Green Fury's mystical based powers were essential in destroying him.

Post-Crisis
After the Crisis on Infinite Earths, her history is altered. Renamed Beatriz Bonilla da Costa, she starts as an amateur model on the beaches of Rio, then becoming a showgirl and stage performer before finding herself serving as a top secret agent for Brazilian government's SNI (Serviço Nacional de Informações - National Information Service), actually Abin (Agência Brasileira de Inteligência - Brazilian Intelligence Agency). In the course of one of her missions, Beatriz is trapped in a pyroplasmic explosion that endows her with the power of being able to exhale an eight-inch burst of fire. She assumes the identity of the Green Fury, and then changes it again to Green Flame. She joins the international superhero team the Global Guardians, of which she is a long-standing, loyal member.

She first meets the American heroes Infinity, Inc. while on a mission to Canada.

Justice League
In the wake of the formation the Justice League International, the Guardians' United Nations funding is withdrawn. Beatriz convinces her teammate and best friend Icemaiden into joining her to apply for Justice League International membership. In the wake of Black Canary's resignation and the abduction of several members, the short-handed JLI takes them on. Eventually, she once again changes her heroic name, this time to Fire in affinity with Icemaiden's shortening of her name to simply Ice. As a result of the "gene bomb" detonated by the alien Dominators, Fire's powers are dramatically increased, but are less reliable for a time.

Fire assumes a big sister role with Ice, watching out for her and her interactions with the "real" world. For example, Fire steps in when Ice does not realize she is being stalked by a delusional fan. However, Fire herself makes mistakes, such as torching the cash she'd just saved while foiling a bank robbery.

Beatriz remains with Justice League International for the remainder of its existence — in fact, she serves the longest tenure of any JLI member. During this time, she is also trained in the arts of battle by Big Barda.

In the battle against Doomsday, Bea looses her powers by taxing them to their limits. She remains with the team but by the time she returns in Justice League America #88, it is too late to help prevent her best friend's death, as Ice is killed by the Overmaster. As Beatriz tries to cope with this loss, she briefly has a romantic relationship with Ice's former lover, Guy Gardner, and a longer one with Nuklon. When the first Icemaiden, Sigrid Nansen, joins the League in Ice's place, Fire befriends her. However, their friendship is tainted by Bea's irrational grief-driven behavior, and Sigrid's romantic attraction to Bea.

When this League collapses, Beatriz returns to Brazil and tries to re-establish herself as the country's main protector. This meets with varied success, which she blames partly on the Martian Manhunter's prominence in the Southern hemisphere.

The Super Buddies
Fire eventually tries to retire from being a superhero and establish a career as an internet glamor girl when Maxwell Lord talks her and several other former JLI members into reforming as a group of "heroes for the common man" called the "Super Buddies". She finds herself sharing an apartment with Mary Marvel and, in a characterization reminiscent of her relationship with Ice, becomes a reluctant "babysitter" for the naive teenager.

In one adventure with the Super Buddies, Fire and the others are given the opportunity to rescue Ice's spirit from Hell (or a similar dimension). Yet like in the Greek myth of Orpheus and Eurydice, Fire cannot resist looking behind her, which causes Ice's spirit to vanish. During the Super Buddies' time in Hell, Etrigan the Demon suggests that it was Fire who was fated to die instead of Ice.

Later, during her time in the group, she encounters an alternate universe version of Ice.

Infinite Crisis
The Super Buddies do not realize that Maxwell Lord is also secretly the Black King of Checkmate. After the Buddies' dissolution, Bea becomes an agent of Checkmate as well. It has not been revealed whether Lord recruited her. Regardless, she helps Booster Gold and Guy Gardner find the connection between Lord and the death of the Blue Beetle. She joins her former JLI teammates against a group of OMACs. She is badly wounded, but is saved by the sacrifice of Dimitri Pushkin, the Rocket Red.

During the Infinite Crisis created by Alexander Luthor, Beatriz returns to her espionage roots by joining Amanda Waller, who took over Checkmate after Lord's death. One of Fire's first missions is to retrieve the A.I., Brother Eye, which had crashed down in Southern Saudi Arabia. This plan is thwarted by Sasha Bordeaux, also formerly of Checkmate.

She appears later, criticizing Booster for his shameless self-promotion while the search continues for the missing superheroes. She is also on hand at a memorial for Ralph Dibny's wife, Sue.

Checkmate

Nearly one year later, after the Crisis, Checkmate is reformed under the supervision of the United Nations and Beatriz becomes the Black King's Knight. Though she no longer reports to Waller (who is made White Queen), Waller blackmails Bea with evidence against her father and forces Bea to perform covert assassinations. Waller had previously implied that Beatriz actually enjoys the violence and depravity that is a part of her job. It is revealed that as a girl Bea was trained to kill by her father.

Despite her past as a dutiful soldier and daughter, Bea expresses remorse over taking part in a Checkmate mission that results in the deaths of as many as 50 Kobra agents, many of whom are immolated by Fire herself. Waller once again blackmails her into covering up a coup in Santa Prisca. There, Fire kills Colonel Computron for Waller to protect her father, who, in the mid-1970s, under a right wing military dictatorship, ordered thousands of innocent deaths in Operation Condor, a US-supported  South American anti-communist program that involved assassinations, torture and forced disappearances. He was never caught and Beatriz had always kept his secret.

When the murder of Computron is exposed by fellow Knight Thomas Jagger, Fire is jailed. After a visit from her superior, the Black King, Col. Taleb Beni Khalid-Isr, Beatriz agrees to turn over her father to international authorities for war crimes. Khalid had convinced her to act as the superhero that he had chosen for his Knight.

Reunited with Ice
In Checkmate #16, after years of anguish and grief over the loss of her friend and ally Ice, Fire is at last reunited with her after the long-deceased hero is miraculously resurrected in the pages of Birds of Prey.

Their renewed relationship is referenced again during a date between Ice and her lover Guy Gardner. Ice refuses his proposal to cohabit on Oa, as she decided to get her life together on Earth, with some help from Beatriz. Gardner claims that Fire is manipulating Ice.

Generation Lost
Fire appears as one of the central characters in Justice League: Generation Lost, a maxi-series taking during the wider Brightest Day event. At the start of the series, Fire is recruited as part of a massive group of superheroes tasked with hunting down the JLI's founder and Ted Kord's murderer, Maxwell Lord. During an encounter with Max at the Justice League's former New York headquarters, Fire is rendered unconscious alongside Ice, Booster Gold, and Captain Atom. The former Justice League members awake to discover that Lord has used his mental abilities to erase his existence from the minds of every single human on the planet, save for those present at the embassy. After she tries to tell Wonder Woman of her killing  of Lord, Wonder Woman refuses to believe it. Fire discovers that Max has mentally influenced the world into believing that Checkmate has dismissed her for failing her psychological evaluation.

Afterward, Fire encounters Lord in JLI headquarters. After mind-controlling Fire and then Booster Gold to prevent them from stopping him, he ports from the old JLI embassy back to Checkmate. Before they can figure out their next move, the base comes under attack by the Creature Commandos. Caught while powered down, Fire is shown having been shot several times. Fire is able to heal by using the bandages of the medic mummy of the Creature Commandos, but is unable to keep Blue Beetle from being kidnapped by Maxwell Lord. While the team deals with the apparent loss of Blue Beetle, Fire bonds with Gavril Ivanovich the current Rocket Red and the two grow close, eventually sharing a passionate kiss.

The New 52
In The New 52 reboot, Fire appears as part of the Justice League International team. Fire is injured toward the end of the first story arc and is sidelined for the remainder of the run.

Powers and abilities
The original Green Fury had magical flame breath powers due to Brazilian mysticism. She could control her flame breath to allow her to fly and land like a rocket. She was able to mystically alter her clothing when needed and change the color of her eyes from green to black, and vice versa. She was also able to create and cast illusions with her "dazzle power" and fire blasts with her white-hot flame or super-cold freezing flame. Her green flame had the magical ability to heal and repair her costume after a battle. Beatriz was also trained by Batman in hand-to-hand combat. Due to the events of the Crisis on Infinite Earths, Green Fury never had any of these magical powers and had a new revised origin.

In her Post-Crisis incarnation, Beatriz's only power, gained from saturation by an organic energy source called Pyroplasm, was the ability to breathe a jet of green flame from her mouth.  During the Invasion crossover event, the alien Dominators set off a "metagene bomb" in the upper atmosphere which affected almost all DC characters with superpowers and, after a period of illness, Fire found her powers greatly magnified as an after-effect. The "new" Fire was now able to completely turn into a being of green plasma, in which form she could fly and throw devastating blasts. Solid objects could pass completely through her form without causing injury, but it took her some time to come to terms with her increased powers, and she often "flamed on" involuntarily when stressed or angry (and sometimes still does), a distressingly common event for a character depicted as having a tendency towards passionate outbursts. The Super Buddies continuity established (and made light of) the fact that flaming on destroyed Bea's clothing, rendering her naked when she stopped using her powers. Checkmate and other appearances have ignored this. Beatriz is also a skilled investigator and espionage agent, and in the latter context was considered a valuable asset by Checkmate chief Amanda Waller for her ability and willingness to kill to complete missions (unlike many of her contemporaries who maintain a no-kill policy).

In other media

Television
 Fire appears in Justice League of America, portrayed by Michelle Hurd.
 Fire appears in Justice League Unlimited, voiced by Maria Canals-Barrera. This version is a member of the Justice League.
 Fire appears in Batman: The Brave and the Bold, voiced by Grey DeLisle. This version directs her powers through her hands instead of her mouth and is a founding member of Justice League International. Additionally, an alternate universe incarnation of Fire named Blaze makes a non-speaking appearance in the episode "Deep Cover for Batman!" as a member of the Injustice Syndicate.
 Fire appears in the Mad segment "That's What Super Friends Are For".
 Fire, as "Green Fury", appears in Powerless, portrayed by Natalie Morales.

Video games
Fire appears in DC Universe Online, voiced by Shawn Sides.

Miscellaneous
Fire makes non-speaking background appearances in DC Super Hero Girls as a student of Super Hero High.

References

External links
 Fire Character History

Comics characters introduced in 1979
DC Comics female superheroes
DC Comics characters who are shapeshifters
DC Comics metahumans
Fictional Hispanic and Latino American people
Fictional Brazilian people
Fictional characters who can turn intangible
Fictional characters with fire or heat abilities
Fictional models
Brazilian superheroes